Trypeta hostilis is a species of tephritid or fruit flies in the genus Trypeta of the family Tephritidae.

References

hostilis